HHC Hardenberg is a football club from Hardenberg, Netherlands. The club is currently playing in the Tweede Divisie.

History 
HHC Hardenberg was founded in 1954, as the result of a merger between Hardenberg Voetbal Club of Hardenberg en SV Heemse of neighbouring Heemse. The letters HHC stand for Hardenberg Heemse Combinatie (Hardenberg Heemse Combination).

The club won its first title, in the Vierde Klasse (Fourth Class), in the 1964–65 season, securing promotion to the Derde Klasse (Third Class). The club played in that division for 11 seasons, and won the title in 1975–76, clinching promotion to the Tweede Klasse (Second Class).

The introduction of the Hoofdklasse changed the structure of the league. The Eerste Klasse (First Class) became the Hoofdklasse, and the Tweede Klasse, where HHC were playing, became the Eerste Klasse (First Class).

HHC was relegated back to what had become the Tweede Klasse after the 1990–91 season. HHC won the playoffs in that division in 1998, securing promotion to the Eerste Klasse (First Class).

In the 2000–01 season, HHC finished second in the Eerste Klasse E, qualifying for the playoffs. In the playoffs, HHC came close to being promoted to the Hoofdklasse. In the 2003–04 season, HHC finished tied on first place in the Eerste Klasse D. A decisive match against Excelsior '31 was lost, but HHC qualified for the playoffs and won both playoff matches, securing promotion to the Hoofdklasse, for the first time in the club's existence.

In the first season on the highest level of amateur football in the Netherlands, the club managed to avoid relegation, finishing the season in the Saturday Hoofdklasse C in 10th place (out of 14). In the 2005–06, HHC won the third periode (period), securing a place in the KNVB Cup 2006-07.

The third season of HHC in the Hoofdklasse ended with the title in the Saturday Hoofdklasse C. In the competition for the national Saturday title, HHC finished bottom of the group, behind Rijnsburgse Boys (champion of the Saturday Hoofdklasse A) and IJsselmeervogels (champion of the Saturday Hoofdklasse B). HHC managed to defend their title in the Saturday Hoofdklasse C the next season.

In the KNVB Cup 2006-07, HHC defeated RKSV Oisterwijk in the first round, but were eliminated by MVV in the second round. A year later, in 2007–08, the club defeated SV Babberich 2–1 in the first round. The second round match against VVSB finished 1–1 after regular time; the score after extra time was 5–4 for HHC. The club was eventually eliminated in the third round, by professional side AGOVV Apeldoorn.

In the KNVB Cup 2008-09, HHC defeated Schijndel and Go Ahead Eagles in the first and second round. The third round was against professional club Feyenoord, and was supposed to be a home match for HHC. However, because of the significance of the match, it was decided that their home venue was insufficient. Therefore, the match was played in Emmen. The Univé Stadium in Emmen was sold out for the first time in more than ten years with 8500 visitors, most of them coming from Hardenberg. The half time score was 1–1, but Feyenoord would go on to win the match 1–5.

The club qualified to the newly established third tier, called Topklasse, at the end of the 2009–10 season through playoffs. In 2016, they entered the new formed Tweede Divisie, the highest amateur level of the Dutch football pyramid.

Honours 
The structure of the Hoofdklasse allows HHC Hardenberg up to three title opportunities in one season: the regular division, the Saturday title and the national title. The overall Saturday title is contested between the champions of the three Saturday leagues, and the national title is contested between the Saturday champion and the Sunday champion.

Hoofdklasse division title: 2
 2006–07, 2007–08

Current squad 
As of 1 September 2020

References

External links 
Club website 

Football clubs in the Netherlands
Association football clubs established in 1954
1954 establishments in the Netherlands
Football clubs in Overijssel
Sport in Hardenberg